Chickenhare and the Hamster of Darkness is a 2022 computer-animated adventure comedy film produced by nWave Pictures, written by David Collard and directed by Benjamin Mousquet (in his directorial debut) and Ben Stassen; it is based on the graphic novel Chickenhare by Chris Grine. The film follows the adventures and coming-of-age journey of Chickenhare, a one-of-a-kind hero born half chicken and half hare, who is eager to fit in and to become an adventurer in spite of his differences.

Plot

Twenty years ago, hare brothers Peter and Lapin are on a quest to find the mystical Hamster of Darkness, to no avail. However, they find something else in their journey, a baby who is both part chicken and part hare. Peter adopts and raises him as his son, naming him Chickenhare. As he grows up, Chickenhare is enamored with plans to follow his father's footsteps.

In the present day, Chickenhare attempts to pass the Royal Adventure Society trials to become an adventurer, but his disguise used to cover his chicken features weighs him down, causing him to fail the test. Undeterred, he decides to search for the Hamster of Darkness to prove himself as an adventurer and visits Lapin, who has been imprisoned after attempting to overthrow Peter as the King of Featherbeard but has information on the artifact. Lapin escapes using one of Chickenhare's feathers and sets off with a crew of prisoners to find the artifact as well. Determined to stop Lapin, Chickenhare, joined by his tortoise servant Abe, follow him.

The duo arrive at a desert city to find a guide to get through the Desert of Death but are intercepted by two of Lapin's goons. The pair are rescued by skunk explorer Meg, who agrees to guide them through the desert.

The group is later captured in a bamboo forest by Pigmies, tribal pig-like creatures who mistake Chickenhare for a god and plan to throw the trio into a volcano as sacrifices for their god. While caged, Chickenhare blames his appearance on his misfortune, but Meg snaps him out of it by telling how she embraced her skunk nature in the past and encourages Chickenhare to do the same as they continue their journey.

At the Frosty Mountains, Chickenhare, Meg, and Abe enter the temple and go through three different trials to find the Hamster of Darkness. After passing said trials, the trio discovers the true artifact hidden in the icy tomb of the long-extinct hamsters, a scepter with a glowing shard of ice embedded in its top. However, Lapin and his crew arrive and take the scepter from the trio. Lapin uses the scepter's power to call forth the ghosts of the long-dead hamsters to take over Featherbeard, not before leaving the trio stranded in the temple. Meg reminds a depressed Chickenhare how his unusual features led them to the temple, and he taps into his innate ability to fly to save Meg and Abe and catch up to Lapin.

Back in Featherbeard, Lapin has taken over the kingdom with the help of the ghost hamsters. With the help of Abe and Meg, Chickenhare gets the scepter back from Lapin, but the scepter's power only responds to the one who first uses it. Chickenhare decides to destroy it and goes to the Royal Adventure Society testing grounds, where he hopes to drop the scepter into the massive pit beneath the area. After a battle, Chickenhare and Lapin go one-on-one for the scepter and fall into the pit. Chickenhare saves himself by flying away, while Lapin falls to his demise. With the scepter destroyed, the ghost hamsters disappear, and Lapin's surviving crew members are arrested by the wolf guards.

Afterward, Chickenhare decides to become an independent adventurer. Peter hands him his treasured golden machete as a sign of support before Chickenhare joins Meg and Abe on a new adventure.

Voice cast
 Jordan Tartakow as Chickenhare, a half-hare and half-chicken who aspires to be an adventurer
 Joey Lotsko as Abe, a sarcastic tortoise who is Chickenhare's servant and best friend
 Laila Berzins as Meg, a martial artist skunk and expert adventurer who offers to guide Chickenhare and Abe on their quest
 Brad Venable and Chris McCune as Peter, Chickenhare's adoptive hare father who is both the ruler of the kingdom of Featherbeard and an idolized explorer
 Danny Fehsenfeld as Lapin, Chickenhare's uncle, a greedy and manipulative hare who dreams of ruling over Featherbeard
 Joseph Camen as Luther, a paternal gorilla and Lapin's long-time henchman
 Dino Andrade as Barry, a Mandarin duck who is Lapin's sidekick
 Cedric Williams and Marcus Griffin as Lance and Whitey, a chicken and a hare respectively who are the cool kids of Featherbeard and bully Chickenhare for his appearance

Production

Development
In July 2011, it was announced that Sony Pictures Animation and Dark Horse Comics were adapting the Chickenhare series into an animated feature film. In October 2012, Grine wrote on the official Chickenhare Facebook page: "Read the screenplay last night. It's quite a bit different from the source material, but that doesn't mean it wasn't terrific! I honestly enjoyed it. Now let's hope it stays on course!" In June 2013, he wrote: "Finally got to read the 2nd draft of the Chickenhare screenplay. Man, if this thing makes it to the big screen, you guys in are in for a treat! It's SO full of adventure and laughs I almost can't believe it. Let's all cross our fingers." In January 2016, Grine wrote on his Twitter account that the film had been cancelled.

In early 2021, nWave Pictures president and CEO Matthieu Zeller announced through Variety that Sony Pictures International Productions was partnering with film director Ben Stassen on nWave's new animated feature film. Chickenhare and the Hamster of Darkness is based on the graphic novels created by Chris Grine and published by Dark Horse comics. Its screenplay, on the other hand is the work of Dave Collard with rewritings by Stassen and Benjamin Mousquet.

The production of Chickenhare started in late 2019 and was completed in early January 2022. It took three years of work with over 200 people involved in the production of the film. Benjamin Mousquet, who made his directorial debut with Stassen after working at the studio as an animator for many years, was immediately drawn to the film's themes of inclusion and friendship. Both directors enjoyed including references to franchises like Indiana Jones.

Music
The pop-rock trio Puggy composed the score for the film, continuing their collaboration with nWave Pictures after The Son of Bigfoot and Bigfoot Family. For this film, the band broke away from its signature pop sound and explored a whole new style with the help of a classical musician, Pavel Guerchovitch.

Release
Chickenhare and the Hamster of Darkness world premiere took on January 23 at the Gaumont Champs-Élysées teather in Paris, later the film opened on February 16 in France, Belgium, the Netherlands, and Luxembourg. It garnered 170.697 admissions on its first weekend in France and grossed a box office of €191 083 on its opening weekend in Belgium.

The film was released by Netflix in the United States and other territories on June 10.

References

External links
 
 
 

2022 computer-animated films
2022 directorial debut films
2022 films
2020s French animated films
Animated films about rabbits and hares
Animated films based on comics
Belgian animated films
Belgian children's films
English-language Netflix original films
Films based on Dark Horse Comics
Films directed by Ben Stassen
French animated films
French children's films
2020s French-language films
2020s English-language films
2020s French films